The 2018–19 Loyola Ramblers women's basketball team represents Loyola University Chicago during the 2018–19 NCAA Division I women's basketball season. The Ramblers, led by third year head coach Kate Achter, play their home games at the Joseph J. Gentile Arena and were members of the Missouri Valley Conference. They finished the season 13–18, 6–12 in MVC play to finish in seventh place. They advanced to the quarterfinals of the Missouri Valley women's tournament where they lost to Missouri State.

Roster

Schedule

|-
!colspan=9 style=| Exhibition

|-
!colspan=9 style=| Non-conference regular season

|-
!colspan=9 style=| Missouri Valley regular season

|-
!colspan=9 style=| Missouri Valley Women's Tournament

See also
2018–19 Loyola Ramblers men's basketball team

References

Loyola Ramblers women's basketball seasons
Loyola
Loyola Ramblers women
Loyola Ramblers women
2010s in Chicago
Loyola Ramblers women
Loyola Ramblers women